Guillermo Nielsen (born 20 April 1951) is an Argentinian economist who was president of the State-owned oil company YPF from 2019 to 2021. He also served as Ambassador of Argentina in Germany designated by President Cristina Fernández de Kirchner between 2008 and 2010.

He earned a degree in Economics from the University of Buenos Aires. During the presidencies of Néstor Kirchner and Eduardo Duhalde he served as Secretary of Finance, working together Minister Roberto Lavagna in the Argentine debt restructuring between 2002 and 2005.

References

1951 births
Living people
Argentine economists
University of Buenos Aires alumni
Ambassadors of Argentina to Germany